Gina Doris le Long (born 1959) is a former international lawn bowler from Jersey.

Bowls career
Le Long has represented Jersey at the Commonwealth Games, in the triples event at the 2006 Commonwealth Games.

In 2005 she won the triples bronze medal at the Atlantic Bowls Championships.

References

Jersey bowls players
1959 births
Living people
Bowls players at the 2006 Commonwealth Games